Club Deportivo Aldeano is a Spanish football team based in Aldeanueva de Ebro, in the autonomous community of La Rioja. Founded in 1948, they play in Regional Preferente – Group 2, holding home games at Estadio San Bartolomé, with a capacity of 2,000 people.

History
After spending the most of their history in the regional leagues, Aldeano became inactive in 2003, after 13 consecutive years in the Regional Preferente. The club returned to action in 2006 under the name of Aldeano River, and achieved a first-ever promotion to Tercera División three years later, changing to their previous name shortly after.

After suffering relegation in 2011, the club returned to Tercera at first attempt, but was again relegated.

Season to season

{|
|valign="top" width=0%|

3 seasons in Tercera División

References

External links
Soccerway team profile

Football clubs in La Rioja (Spain)
Association football clubs established in 1948
1948 establishments in Spain